Bulbophyllum schillerianum, commonly known as the red rope orchid, is a species of epiphytic or lithophytic orchid. It has well-spaced pseudobulbs each with a single grooved leaf and cluster of small, red or orange flowers with a hairy labellum. It grows on trees and rocks sometimes in rainforest but also on trees in cleared paddocks, and is endemic to eastern Australia.

Description
Flowering occurs from March to August.

Taxonomy and naming
Bulbophyllum schillerianum was first formally described in 1993 by Heinrich Gustav Reichenbach who published the description in Hamburg Garten- und Blumenzeitung. The type specimen was grown in "Herrn Consul Schiller's" garden, grown by "Herrn Stange".

Distribution and habitat
The red rope orchid grows on rainforest trees and mangroves, on boulders, near stream banks, on rocks and sometimes on trees remaining in cleared paddocks. It is found between the Cedar Bay National Park in Queensland and the Hunter River in New South Wales.

References

schillerianum
Orchids of New South Wales
Orchids of Queensland
Endemic orchids of Australia
Plants described in 1860